Narcissus algirus is a species of the genus Narcissus (daffodils) in the family Amaryllidaceae.

References

algirus